"Why Me?" is a 1992 song by Northern-Irish singer Linda Martin. Logan is, to date, the only person to win the contest with a song composed for him, win the contest with his own song and then compose another winner.

The song is a ballad, building in intensity towards the end. The singer describes her thoughts about her lover and asks why she is the lucky one to have his love, as against anyone else.

The song was performed seventeenth on the night, following the 's Michael Ball with "One Step Out of Time" and preceding 's  &  with "Alt det som ingen ser". At the close of voting, it had received 155 points, placing 1st in a field of 23.

Logan covered the song on his 2001 album Reach for Me.

Charts

References

Eurovision songs of Ireland
Eurovision songs of 1992
Eurovision Song Contest winning songs
1992 singles
1992 songs
Linda Martin songs
Songs written by Johnny Logan (singer)
Irish Singles Chart number-one singles